Robin Elaine Comey (born September 16, 1967, in Minneapolis Minnesota) is an American politician who serves in the Connecticut House of Representatives representing the 102nd district in New Haven County. On March 16th, 2023, Comey was arrested for DUI following a crash near the Connecticut State Capitol building.

Political career

Election
Comey was elected in the general election on November 6, 2018, winning 55 percent of the Democratic Party vote over 45 percent of Republican candidate Robert Imperato.

References

 Connecticut Democrats
Comey, Robin 
Living people
21st-century American politicians
21st-century American women politicians
Women state legislators in Connecticut
Politicians from Minneapolis
1967 births